This is a list of earthquakes in Eritrea:

See also
Geology of Eritrea

References

Sources

 
Earthquakes
Eritrea